Fragments was a Russian humorous, literary and artistic weekly magazine published in St Petersburg from 1881 to 1916.

History
From 1881 to 1906 Fragments was published by the popular writer Nikolay Leykin. From 1906 to 1908 it was run by the humorist Viktor Bilibin.

In the 1880s Fragments was known as the most liberal of Russian humorous magazines. Fragments played an important part in the early career of Anton Chekhov. From 1882 to 1887 Fragments published more than 270 of Chekhov's works.

Contributors

Poets and writers
Alexander Amfiteatrov
Anton Chekhov
Vladimir Gilyarovsky
Pyotr Gnedich
Evgeny Kohn
Nikolai Leskov
Konstantin Lydov
Vladimir Mazurkevich
Liodor Palmin
Nikolay Poznyakov

Artists
Aleksey Afanas'ev
Alexander I. Lebedev
Nikolay Chekhov

References

1881 establishments in the Russian Empire
Anton Chekhov
Defunct literary magazines published in Europe
Defunct magazines published in Russia
Defunct political magazines
Magazines established in 1881
Magazines disestablished in 1916
Magazines published in Saint Petersburg
Russian humour
Russian-language magazines
Literary magazines published in Russia
Political magazines published in Russia
Satirical magazines published in Russia